Parliamentary elections were held in Chile on 2 March 1941. As the largest parties the Radical Party emerged in the Chamber of Deputies and the Conservative Party in the Senate.

Electoral system
The term length for Senators was eight years, with around half of the Senators elected every four years. This election saw 20 of the 45 Senate seats up for election.

Results

Senate

Chamber of Deputies

References

Elections in Chile
1941 in Chile
Chile
March 1941 events
Election and referendum articles with incomplete results